The Loup is a small village in County Londonderry, Northern Ireland. It lies near the western shore of Lough Neagh between Moneymore, Magherafelt, Ballyronan and Coagh, within the district of Mid Ulster.

Sport
Gaelic games are very popular in the area, with An Lúb CLG being the local club.

References

External links
 NI Neighbourhood Information System
 The Public Reference Office of Northern Ireland
 List of townlands in Ardtrea and Ardtrea North
 Map highlighting the village part of the Loup

Villages in County Londonderry
Mid-Ulster District